Sealy High School (SHS) is a public high school located in the city of Sealy, Texas, in Austin County, United States and classified as a 4A school by the UIL. It is a part of the Sealy Independent School District. A new, multimillion-dollar campus was constructed in 2005. In 2005 SHS struggled with unacceptable scores on the Texas Assessment of Knowledge and Skills (TAKS) test. However, it regained its acceptable state rankings in 2006 testing. In 2013, the school was rated "Met Standard" by the Texas Education Agency.

Athletics
The Sealy Tigers compete in the following sports

Baseball
Basketball
Cross Country
Football
Golf
Powerlifting
Soccer
Softball
Tennis
Track and Field
Volleyball

State Titles
Sealy (UIL)

Football
1978(2A), 1994(3A), 1995(3A), 1996(3A), 1997(3A)
Boys Track
1971(2A), 1972(2A)

Sealy Austin County (PVIL)

Football
1956(PVIL-A)

Notable alumni
 Eric Dickerson - Hall of Fame NFL player
 Ricky Seals-Jones - NFL player with the New York Giants

References

External links
 Sealy ISD website

Schools in Austin County, Texas
Public high schools in Texas